Lexcorp (originally styled as LexCorp or LuthorCorp) is a fictional organized crime company appearing in American comic book published by DC Comics. Owned by Lex Luthor, the company is based in Metropolis and is headquartered in LexCorp Tower.

History
The establishment of LexCorp by Lex Luthor is a stark departure from earlier portrayals of the company's founder, transitioning the character from a warlord and would-be dictator into a power-mad business magnate. LexCorp was founded primarily to serve as a front to Lex Luthor's criminal enterprise while simultaneously being a symbol of Luthor's victory over Superman, as Luthor values defeating the Superman over financial gain (illustrated by abandoning a hollow victory after plundering Fort Knox). Luthor intends to convert LexCorp into a legitimate operation after his retirement from crime, and in the future it is shown being a highly successful non-criminal enterprise, to Superman's pleasure.

Organization and growth
LexCorp was originally organized as an aerospace engineering firm started in the top floor offices of the Daily Planet building in Metropolis, and has since become one of the world's largest, most diversified multinational conglomerates.

The company grew by acquisition, starting with struggling airlines "Inter-Continental Airlines" and "Atlantic Coast Air Systems", renaming them to "LexAir". When rising profits were threatened by fuel shortages, LexCorp bought out Southwestern Petroleum and renamed it "LexOil". This pattern of acquisition continued to include the Daily Planet and several Metropolis businesses before LexCorp sold the unprofitable Daily Planet and its building to TransNational Enterprises, establishing an L-shaped 96-story high-rise as its new headquarters.

LexCorp grew rapidly into a diverse international conglomerate with interests in utilities, waste management, industrial manufacturing, computer hardware and software, chemicals, retail, bio-engineering, weapons, pharmaceuticals, oil, communications, airlines, real estate, hotels, restaurants, technology, media, financial services, robotics, security,  transportation, satellites, stock brokerage houses, cash businesses, and food. By the timeframe of the Alliance Invasion it was estimated that LexCorp either directly or indirectly employed nearly two-thirds of Metropolis' population of 11 million people, dominating commerce around much of the world. Among those many subsidiaries are such diverse businesses as Advanced Research Laboratories, Secur-Corp Armored Car Service, North American Robotics, Hell's Gate Disposal Services, and the Good Foods Group, owners of Ralli's Family Restaurants, Big Belly Burger and the Koul-Brau Breweries. LexCorp's major subsidiary companies include LexComp, LexChemical, LexEl Investments, LexMart, LexComm, FedLex, LexOil, LexAir, and TelLex.

When CEO Lex Luthor was elected President of the United States, he divested from LexCorp to avoid a conflict of interest and Talia al Ghul became the company's CEO. Al Ghul donated a large portion of its profits to the Wayne Foundation during Superman and Batman's year-long absences. Following his dismissal as president he fired her and took back his place, though she secretly kept a portion of stock.

Competitors include Wayne Enterprises, Kord Enterprises, Queen Industries and S.T.A.R. Labs. LexCorp provides sponsorship to the superhero team The Conglomerate along with American Steel, Dante Foods, Dupree Chemical, Ferris Aircraft, S.T.A.R. Labs, Ovel Oil, Pax Entertainment, and Stagg Enterprises.

Decline
Following Luthor's public acquittal from criminal charges Lana Lang became LexCorp's new CEO and LexCorp began its decline. Lana Lang was dismissed from her post due to a contractual clause in all LexCorp employment charters forbidding aiding Superman in any way, after she attempted to use a LexCorp security unit to aid Superman in a battle against Atlas.

A year after the events of Infinite Crisis, Lex Luthor had been stripped of his wealth and assets; LexCorp was dissolved and sold off to several competitors, most notably to Wayne Enterprises.

Thunder Corporation
Lex Luthor secretly owns the powerful and legitimate Thunder Corporation which he controls through a false identity, maintaining the illusion of the chairman/principal stockholder "Lucius D. Tommytown" through fake magazine articles and actors because he thought himself too honest to be anything but a criminal. The Thunder Corporation headquarters "Zephrymore Building" fronts Lex Luthor's criminal operations and penthouse.

In other media

Television
 LexCorp is depicted in the Ruby-Spears Superman cartoons.
 LexCorp appears in the Lois and Clark: The New Adventures of Superman television series.
 LexCorp has been shown in episodes of Superman: The Animated Series and Justice League, with it being one of the tallest buildings in Metropolis.
 The major conglomerate featured regularly on Smallville is LuthorCorp, an agricultural conglomerate which was founded by Lionel Luthor with interest from meteor rocks, and scientific experiments. Following Lionel's incarceration in the fourth season, LuthorCorp comes under Lex's control and gradually turns into a corporation with several subsidiaries and divisions. After his disappearance, Tess Mercer takes control and forms a partnership with Zod to develop a Solar Tower. In the series finale, the LuthorCorp tower is damaged by several explosions which disfigure the corporate logo on the side of the building, with the scarred remains spelling out "LexCorp".
 In the cartoon Krypto the Superdog, LexCorp is shown to be the home of Luthor's pet lizard Ignatius.
 In The Batman, LexCorp is shown in the two part episode "The Superman/Batman Story".
 LexCorp is featured in the TV shows set in the Arrowverse:
 The Flash co-creator Andrew Kreisberg revealed that LexCorp was going to appear in the pilot episode as an Easter egg, but was cut.
 In season 2 of Supergirl, LexCorp appears under the name "Luthor Corp". Lex Luthor's sister Lena takes over the company after Lex's imprisonment and renames it to "L-Corp" to distance the company from her brother's reputation. This also makes her the target of assassin John Corben, whom Lex hires to assassinate her.
 In season 3 of Supergirl, Lena relegates much of her L-Corp responsibilities to her new CFO Samantha Arias. When Arias is revealed to be a Kryptonian villain named Reign, L-Corp begins experimenting with synthetic Kryptonite to combat her.
 In season 4 of Supergirl, L-Corp focuses its research on Harun-El (Black Kryptonite) as a possible miracle cure for all ailments. Lex is released from prison on a medical furlough and uses his influence within the company to ally with Kasnia and AmerTek to instigate a false-flag operation to make himself look like a hero.
 In season 5 of Supergirl, the events of Crisis on Infinite Earths drastically affect the history and current standing of the company. In the new reality, Lex was never arrested and the company never became L-Corp, retaining the Luthor Corp name. Lex has always been CEO and now owns the D.E.O. However, Leviathan has infiltrated the Board of Directors and use the company to spread their Obsidian Platinum virtual reality lenses to conquer the planet. 
 In season 6 of Supergirl, following Leviathan's defeat, Lex is arrested for various crimes in association with them. He is able to receive an acquittal and returns as CEO. Lena tries to combat his influences by embezzling his funds for better causes. In retaliation, he bombed a children's hospital that Lena paid for. This causes her to resign and leave Lex in total control of the company. After Lex unintentionally imprisoned himself and Nyxlygsptlnz in the phantom Zone, Lena reclaimed the company and established the Lena Luthor Foundation.
 In the third episode of Powerless, the team of Wayne Security loses their contract with Ace Chemicals due to their own CEO's incompetence. The CEO of Ace Chemicals decides to go with LexCorp instead.
 LexCorp is featured in the Harley Quinn episode "Bachelorette". Eris had plans to sell Themyscira to Lex Luthor and LexCorp. This plan was thwarted by Harley Quinn and Poison Ivy.
 LexCorp appears in the TV series 2019, DC Super Hero Girls, episode "#SweetJustice", where Lex presents the best technological advances of his company to improve the world, until his younger sister Lena hacks the system of his inventions, uses the robots and Lex's battle suit to destroy the fun places in Metropolis, but after the Super Hero Girls defeat her, the company fixes all the damage Lena caused. The company appears in the episode "#AllyCat" where Catwoman and the Super Hero Girls (except Batgirl) go under cover to retrieve the Book of Eternity, which gives its possessor the ability to see and control the future, and insists that it is too dangerous for any mortal to possess.

Film
 LexCorp is shown in the animated film Justice League: The New Frontier, where it is referred to as "LexCo".
 LexCorp is mentioned in a piece of scrolling text in one of the web pages for The Dark Knight'''s viral marketing.
 LexCorp's logo can be seen during the beginning of the DVD feature Superman/Batman: Public Enemies. It also marked on Lex Luthor's armor as well.
 Vandal Savage hired LexCorp to make a device that could steal information (in a discussion with Mirror Master) from the Batcomputer in Justice League: Doom.

 LexCorp appears in the DC Extended Universe:
 In the 2013 film Man of Steel, LexCorp is shown both on the skyline of Metropolis and Smallville and on several trucks that appear throughout the film.
 LexCorp appears in Batman v Superman: Dawn of Justice. In the film, it is mentioned that LexCorp was founded by Alexander Luthor Sr., Lex Luthor's father. Senators Finch and Barrows visit Lex who tells them his idea of using the recently acquired kryptonite xenomineral as an official "silver bullet" deterrent against Superman, if the alien superhero decides to turn against humanity. He also keeps General Zod's corpse in his laboratory and uses his remains to access the Kryptonian scout ship. After the destruction of the US Capitol, Batman breaks into the well-guarded LexCorp building, successfully stealing the Kryptonite from the inside, exactly what Lex wanted. Following the death of Superman and the exposure of Lex Luthor by Lois Lane as the primary supercriminal culprit behind the numerous unspeakable crimes against peace and humanity, Lex is arrested and deposed as CEO of LexCorp.
 LexCorp is mentioned briefly in Son of Batman when Bruce Wayne is discussing corporation business.
 LexCorp appears in the films set in DC Animated Movie Universe:
 In Justice League: War, an oil tanker is seen with the LexCorp logo during a battle between Superman, Batman, and Green Lantern. During the fight, the tanker is blown up. 
 LexCorp building appears in The Death of Superman.
 LexCorp appears in DC League of Super-Pets.

Video games
 In Mortal Kombat vs. DC Universe, the background of LexCorp is seen when players fight in Metropolis.
 LexCorp appears in DC Universe Online. LexCorp Tower is located in Downtown Metropolis. The soldiers of LexCorp consist of Lexcorp Shock Troopers, Lexcorp Heavy Troopers, Lexcorp Security Guards, Lexcorp Enforcers, and Lexcorp Gladiators.
 LexCorp appears in Lego Batman 2: DC Super Heroes. In this adaptation, LexCorp is featured as the main area for the level Research and Development. In addition, robots called LexBots are frequent enemies in the game as well as playable characters. "LexCorp Security" and "LexCorp Heavy" are also two minor playable characters in the handheld versions of the game.
 LexCorp is referenced in Batman: Arkham Origins. In Penguin's office, there is list of companies which includes LexCorp. Two of LexCorp subsidiaries, Big Belly Burger and Koul-Brau Breweries, appear in the game.
 In Batman: Arkham Knight, numerous buildings and billboards with LexCorp on them are seen. Lex leave a voicemail for Bruce asking if LexCorp can purchase Wayne Enterprises' Applied Sciences division.
 In Lego Dimensions, LexCorp is temporally seen in the game when Lord Sauron retrieves the Locate Keystone and uses it to plant his lair on top of the building.
 In Lego DC Super-Villains'', LexCorp is featured in the Metropolis portion and in game as a level as Luthor and the Legion of Doom break in and battle Deathstorm. A portal to Apokolips is accessible as well at the top of LexCorp Tower.

See also
 Kord Enterprises
 Wayne Enterprises

References

DC Comics organizations
Fictional companies
DC Comics locations
Metropolis (comics)
1972 in comics
Fictional buildings and structures originating in comic books